Paul Adado (born 21 October 1983 in Lomé) is a former Togolese footballer who played as a central defender or defensive midfielder.

Career 
In his career Adado played for Dynamic Togolais Lomé, Al-Nasr (Benghazi), Apollon Smyrnis, Litex Lovech, Vidima-Rakovski Sevlievo, Doxa Drama, PAS Giannina and Panserraikos.

Honours

Club
Litex Lovech
 Bulgarian Cup: 2003–04

References

External links
 

1983 births
21st-century Togolese people
Living people
Togolese footballers
Association football defenders
Apollon Smyrnis F.C. players
PFC Litex Lovech players
PFC Vidima-Rakovski Sevlievo players
PAS Giannina F.C. players
Panserraikos F.C. players
Expatriate footballers in Libya
Expatriate footballers in Bulgaria
Expatriate footballers in Greece
Togolese expatriates in Libya
Togolese expatriates in Bulgaria
First Professional Football League (Bulgaria) players
Togo international footballers